Uncle's (Swedish: Stampen) is a 1955 Swedish comedy film directed by  and starring Nils Poppe, Ann-Marie Gyllenspetz and Holger Löwenadler. It was shot at the Råsunda Studios in Stockholm. The film's sets were designed by the art director P.A. Lundgren.

Synopsis
Patrik works in a pawnshop and Viveka is a maid. They meet and are attracted to each other, but both are embarrassed about their real jobs and pretend otherwise. Soon this leads to misunderstandings and further complications ensue.

Cast
 Nils Poppe as 	Patrik Palmquist
 Ann-Marie Gyllenspetz as 	Viveka Svensson
 Holger Löwenadler as	August Larsson
 Gunnar Björnstrand as Acke Kullerstedt
 Håkan Westergren as Teofon Svensson
 Siv Ericks as 	Sylvia
 Sven-Eric Gamble as 	Hogge
 Carl Ström as Oskar Oxelblad
 Gull Natorp as Landlady
 Margita Lindström as 	Ulla-Britt Svensson
 Gloria Rose as	Dancer 
 Ludde Juberg as 	Customer with Parrot
 Emmy Albiin as 	Amalia Pettersson 
 Birgitta Ander as 	Dancer 
 Frithiof Bjärne as Truck Driver 
 Gregor Dahlman as 	Propp 
 David Erikson as 	Svensson's Driver 
 Claes Esphagen as 	Police Officer 
 Sven Holmberg as 	Police Officer
 Ragnar Klange as 	Fastén 
 Uno Larsson as 	Hot Dog Salesman 
 Rune Ottoson as 	Police Officer 
 Gösta Qvist as 	Customer 
 Olav Riégo as 	Customer with Suit 
 Mille Schmidt as 	Customer with Lighter 
 Georg Skarstedt as 	Karl-Fredrik 
 Eric von Gegerfelt as 	Porter 
 Nils Whiten as Older Customer
 Birger Åsander as 	Man in Line

References

Bibliography 
 Qvist, Per Olov & von Bagh, Peter. Guide to the Cinema of Sweden and Finland. Greenwood Publishing Group, 2000.

External links 
 

1955 films
Swedish comedy films
1955 comedy films
1950s Swedish-language films
Films directed by Hans Lagerkvist
Swedish black-and-white films
1950s Swedish films